Aud is an unincorporated community in Osage County, in the U.S. state of Missouri.

History
A post office called Aud was established in 1889, and remained in operation until 1954. The community has the name of Joseph Aud, the original owner of the town site.

References

Unincorporated communities in Osage County, Missouri
Unincorporated communities in Missouri
Jefferson City metropolitan area